Instant breakfast typically refers to breakfast food products that are manufactured in a powdered form, which are generally prepared with the addition of milk and then consumed as a drink. Some instant breakfasts are produced and marketed in liquid form. The target market for instant breakfast products includes consumers who tend to be busy, such as students and working adults.

Etymology
Powdered instant breakfast has been described as a breakfast substitute, used as a quick meal replacement in place of traditional quickly prepared breakfast foods such as bacon and eggs, oatmeal and pancakes.

Brands
Carnation-brand Instant Breakfast (Renamed Carnation Breakfast Essentials in 2022) was introduced in 1964. It is a powdered instant drink that is manufactured with protein, vitamins and minerals and sugar. It is typically prepared with milk, and is available in different flavors, such as chocolate, vanilla and strawberry. Powdered forms are marketed in individual-serving packets and in cans. Carnation also manufactures prepared bottled instant breakfast drinks in liquid form.

See also

 Ensure
 Instant coffee
 Instant noodles
 Instant soup
 List of breakfast foods
 List of breakfast topics
 List of dried foods
 Powdered milk
 Protein shake
 Quaker Instant Oatmeal
 Ready Brek
 Tang

References

Further reading
 Sheth, Jagdish  (2011). Models of Buyer Behavior. Marketing Classics Press. Chapter 13. p. 255. 
 Lutz, Carroll; Przytulsk, Karen (2010). Nutrition and Diet Therapy. p. 257. 
 
 Instant Oatmeal Increases Satiety and Reduces Energy Intake Compared to a Ready-to-Eat Oat-Based Breakfast Cereal
 Abnehmen Tipps (in German)

External links
 Ward, Elizabeth (2012). "Instant Breakfast". Men's Health magazine.

Breakfast
Dried foods
Powdered drink mixes
Drinks